The Bank of Baroda Uganda Limited, also known as the Bank of Baroda Uganda (BBU), is a commercial bank in Uganda and a wholly owned subsidiary of Indian  government owned banking and financial service company  Bank of Baroda . It is one of the commercial banks licensed by the Bank of Uganda, the national banking regulator.

Overview
BBU is involved in all aspects of commercial banking, focusing on large corporations, small and medium enterprises, and individuals. BBU is a subsidiary of the Bank of Baroda (BoB), an international bank with headquarters in Mumbai, India. BBU is listed on the Uganda Securities Exchange (USE) where it trades under the symbol "BOBU".

History
BoB opened its first overseas branches in Mombasa, Kenya  and Kampala, Uganda in 1953. BBU commenced operations in Uganda on 18 December 1953, initially as an overseas branch of BoB. On 1 November 1969, BBU was incorporated in Uganda. In 1972, BBU acquired the banking business of the Bank of India Uganda Limited, and the government of Uganda acquired a 49 percent shareholding in BBU, leaving BoB with a 51 percent shareholding. In 1999, the government divested its 49 percent shareholding, returning full ownership of BBU to BoB. In November 2002, BBU offered 20 percent of its shares to institutional and private investors on the USE through an initial public offering.

Subsidiaries
BBU owns all of Baroda Capital Markets (Uganda) Limited, which was established in 1993. The subsidiary is a broker/dealer in capital markets and is licensed by Uganda's Capital Markets Authority (CMA). The Baroda brokerage is a member of the CMA Governing Council.

Ownership
The following table shows the ten largest shareholders of BBU stock, as of 31 December 2018.

Branch network
, BBU had a branch network in all parts of Uganda, including:
 Head Office - 18 Kampala Road, Kampala (Main Branch)
 Railway Station Branch - Esso Corner, 6 Jinja Road, Kampala
 Industrial Area Branch - 37–43 Mulwana Road, Kampala
 Kololo Branch - 31 Kira Road, Kololo, Kampala
 Kansanga Branch - 70/378 Kampala–Ggaba Road, Kansanga, Kampala
 Ovino Market Branch - 24–28 Rashid Khamis Road, Old Kampala, Kampala
 Kawempe Branch - Shree Hari Complex, 35/36 Kawempe-Bombo Road, Kawempe
 Entebbe Branch - 24 Gower's Road, Entebbe
 Mukono Branch - 59-67 Kampala-Jinja Road, Mukono
 Jinja Branch - 16 a&b Iganga Road, Jinja
 Lugazi Branch - SCOUL Secondary School Premises, Jinja Road, Lugazi
 Iganga Branch - 84A & 84B Main Street, Iganga
 Mbale Branch - Baroda House, 3 Pallisa Road, Mbale
 Mbarara Branch - 11 Masaka Road, Mbarara  	
 Kabale Branch - 94 Kabale Road, Kabale
 Lira Branch - 2 Aputi Road, Lira, Uganda.

See also

 List of banks in Uganda
 Banking in Uganda
 Bank of Baroda Tanzania Limited

References

External links
 Official website
 Bank of Baroda India Website
   Uganda Securities Exchange Website
 Baroda to replace ATMs with cash recycler machines. As of 10 April 2020.

Banks of Uganda
Bank of Baroda
Companies listed on the Uganda Securities Exchange
Banks established in 1953
1953 establishments in Uganda
Companies based in Kampala